David Rosenthal may refer to:

David Rosenthal (musician) (born 1962), American keyboardist, music producer, and songwriter
David H. Rosenthal (1945–1992), American author, poet, editor and translator
David M. Rosenthal (philosopher)  (fl. 1970s to present), philosopher at the City University of New York
David M. Rosenthal (director) (born 1969), American filmmaker, writer and director
David S. Rosenthal (fl. 1990s to present), American television producer
David S. H. Rosenthal (born 1948), computer scientist

See also
David Rosenthall, Archdeacon of Singapore 1945-1947